The Lublin R-XII was the Polish three-seat sports and touring aircraft, designed in 1930 in the Plage i Laśkiewicz factory in Lublin, that remained a prototype.

Design and development
Plage i Laśkiewicz works was among factories, that developed sports aircraft for an order of the LOPP paramilitary organization. Its design, the Lublin R-XII, was basically a scaled down passenger aircraft Lublin R-XI. The main designer was Jerzy Rudlicki. The only prototype was flown in autumn 1930 (registration SP-AFB). It was not built in series.

The aircraft was not successful and its performance was not satisfactory because of too much weight. It did not take part in the 3rd Polish Light Aircraft contest because of a weight limit. It was owned by the factory and little used, after a few years it was scrapped. The R-XII was the only sports aircraft of Plage i Laśkiewicz.

Description
A mixed construction cantilever high-wing monoplane, single-engine, conventional in layout. It had a steel framed, canvas covered fuselage (engine part covered with duralumin) and a single-piece, plywood-covered, two-spar elliptical wing of wooden construction. The empennage was of steel construction, canvas covered. In a closed cabin under the wing there were two places side-by-side, with double controls, behind them was the third seat or a place for baggage. The cabin had single door on the left and front and rear doors on the right. It had a conventional fixed landing gear, with a rear skid, the main gear was joined with wings by vertical struts with oil and air shock absorbers. It had a single 5-cylinder air-cooled Armstrong-Siddeley Genet uncovered radial engine in front, delivering  take-off power and  nominal power, driving a two-blade propeller. A fuel tank was in the fuselage.

Specifications

See also

References

External links
Photos and drawings at Ugolok Neba page

1930s Polish sport aircraft
R12
Single-engined tractor aircraft
High-wing aircraft
Aircraft first flown in 1930
Conventional landing gear